The Wichita State Shockers football team was the college football program of Wichita State University in Wichita, Kansas. The Shockers fielded a team from 1897 to 1986. They played their home games at Cessna Stadium and were members of the Missouri Valley Conference until the program was discontinued. The team was known as Fairmount from its first season in 1897 to 1925 and Wichita from 1926 through 1963.

History

First game 

The first official football game played by Wichita State was in 1897, when they were known as Fairmount, under the coaching of T. H. Morrison. Fairmount defeated Wichita High School, now known as Wichita East, by a score of 12–4 in the only game played that year.

1905 night game  

In the 1905 season, the Coleman Company set up temporary gas-powered lighting for a night game against Cooper College (now called the Sterling Warriors).  It was the first night football game played west of the Mississippi River.  Fairmount won the game 24–0.

1905 "experimental" game 

On December 25, 1905, Fairmount played a game against the Washburn Ichabods using a set of experimental rules. The game was officiated by then Washburn head coach John H. Outland.

The experiment was considered a failure. Outland commented, "It seems to me that the distance required in three downs would almost eliminate touchdowns, except through fakes or flukes." The Los Angeles Times reported that there was much kicking and that the game was considered much safer than regular play, but that the new rule was not "conducive to the sport."

In his history of the sport of football, David M. Nelson concluded that "the first forward passes were thrown at the end of the 1905 season in a game between Fairmount and Washburn colleges in Kansas." According to Nelson, Washburn completed three passes, and Fairmount completed two.

Plane crash 

On October 2, 1970, a plane crashed that was carrying about half of the football team on their way to play a game against Utah State University. 31 people were killed.  The game was canceled, and the Utah State football team held a memorial service at the stadium where the game was to have been played.

Breaking the color barrier in college football coaching 

When Willie Jeffries became Wichita State’s head coach in 1979, he became the first African-American head coach of a Division I-A football program. Former T. C. Williams High School football coach Herman Boone, who was portrayed by Denzel Washington in the film Remember the Titans, compared Jeffries’s hiring to that of Jackie Robinson signing with the Brooklyn Dodgers.

Program discontinued 
On December 2, 1986, Wichita State President Warren Armstrong announced that the university would no longer sponsor football due to the financial strain the program placed on the university. On May 16, 2009 the Wichita State University alumni association held an all football players reunion at Cessna Stadium.

Potential program revivals 
In 1992, a study was done on Cessna Stadium to comply with I-A football standards. It was shown that $24 million in improvements were needed.

In 1997, the cost was cited at $11 million to restart the football program and three other women's sports.

In 1998, an advisory committee at Wichita State recommended reinstating the football program at Wichita State after a 15-month study for $70,000.

In 2006, Wichita Mayor Carlos Mayans proposed to use public funds to restart the football program at Wichita State. He would subsequently drop the plan weeks later.

In 2012, an attempt was made to begin a club-level football team at Wichita State with hopes of eventually reviving the football program, though no official endorsement was given by the university.

Wichita State's 2017 move to the American Athletic Conference leaves it as the only full member of the conference which does not play football. However, the American has 11 football-playing schools, as Navy is an associate member for football only.

Cessna Stadium demolition
On April 15, 2020, it was announced that the Kansas Board of Regents had given Wichita State University permission to demolish Cessna Stadium, the former home of the school's football team. The stadium is still used by the school’s track and field, soccer, and lacrosse programs. No plans have been made for the construction of a new multi-purpose athletic facility to replace the decrepit stadium.

Conference championships 
Wichita State won fourteen conference titles.

Record versus Missouri Valley Conference 
The records below only includes games while a member of the conference and does not include games against teams listed below considered non-conference games.

Record against Kansas schools

Bowl games 
The Shockers played in three bowl games and had an 0–3 record.

Notable players

Pro Football Hall of Fame
 Bill Parcells, Linebacker (1961–63), Hall of Famer as a coach

College Football Hall of Fame
 Jim Bausch, Halfback, 1927

All-Americans
 Lynn Duncan, DT- 1969 (AP-3rd Team)

NCAA Records
 Longest field goal (tied) – Joe Williams 67 yards vs Southern Illinois October 21, 1978

In popular culture
A fictional version of the program is shown in the Apple TV+ show Ted Lasso. The show depicts the Shockers winning a national championship at the NCAA Division II level under the titular character.

See also
 Ackerman Island; some games were played between Fairmount College and Friends University in the 1920s at Ackerman Island in downtown Wichita.

References

 
American football teams established in 1895
1895 establishments in Kansas